Trochoidea is a genus of air-breathing land snails, terrestrial pulmonate gastropod mollusks in the subfamily Helicellinae of the family Geomitridae. 
 The name means "those that are shaped like a top".

(The same name, Trochoidea is currently also used for a superfamily of sea snails with gills, a superfamily that includes the top shells, Trochidae, and the turban shells, Turbinidae.)

Species
Species within the genus Trochoidea include:
 Trochoidea caroni (Deshayes, 1830)		
 Trochoidea cucullus (Martens, 1873)		
 Trochoidea cumiae (Calcara, 1847)
 Trochoidea elata (A.E.J. Férussac, 1819) (synonym: Helix elata Férussac, 1819)
 Trochoidea elegans (Gmelin, 1791)
 Trochoidea liebetruti (Albers, 1852)	 	
 Trochoidea pumilio (Dillwyn, 1817)
 Trochoidea pyramidata (Draparnaud, 1805)
 Trochoidea schembrii Pfeiffer, 1848
 Trochoidea spratti	(Pfeiffer, 1846)
 Trochoidea tarentina (Pfeiffer, 1848)	 	
 Trochoidea trochoides (Poiret, 1789)

The following species have been brought into synonymy:
 Trochoidea amanda (Rossmässler, 1838): synonym of Cernuella amanda E.A. Rossmässler, 1838 
 Trochoidea betulonensis : synonym of Xerocrassa montserratensis ssp. betulonensis 
 Trochoidea carinatoglobosa (Haas, 1934): synonym of Xerocrassa carinatoglobosa (F. Haas, 1934)
 Trochoidea claudinae : synonym of Xerocrassa claudinae
 Trochoidea davidiana (Bourguignat, 1863): synonym of Xerocrassa davidiana (Bourguignat, 1863) (superseded combination)
 Trochoidea conica J.P.R. Draparnaud, 1801: synonym of Trochoidea trochoides (Poiret, 1789)
 Trochoidea crenulata J. Germain, 1930: synonym of Trochoidea trochoides (Poiret, 1789)
 Trochoidea geyeri : synonym of Xerocrassa geyeri (Soós, 1926)
 Trochoidea gharlapsi : synonym of Xerocrassa gharlapsi
 Trochoidea infulata M. Paulucci, 1882: synonym of Trochoidea trochoides (Poiret, 1789)
 Trochoidea jimenensis : synonym of Xerocrassa jimenensis
  † Trochoidea miocaenica Gottschick & Wenz, 1927: synonym of † Miodiscula miocaenica (Gottschick & Wenz, 1927) (new combination)
 Trochoidea molinae : synonym of Xerocrassa molinae
 Trochoidea montserratensis : synonym of Xerocrassa montserratensis
 Trochoidea penchinati (Bourguignat, 1868): synonym of Xerocrassa penchinati (Bourguignat, 1868) (superseded combination)
 Trochoidea numidica Moquin-Tandon, 1847: synonym of Trochoidea pyramidata (Draparnaud, 1805)
 Trochoidea picardi Haas, 1933: synonym of Xerocrassa picardi Haas, 1933
 Trochoidea rhabdota (Sturany, 1901): synonym of Xerocrassa rhabdota (R. Sturany, 1901) 
 Trochoidea pseudojacosta Forcart, 1976: synonym of Xerocrassa pseudojacosta (Forcart, 1976) (original combination)
 Trochoidea rugosa A. Aradas & G. Maggiore, 1839: synonym of Trochoidea trochoides (Poiret, 1789)
 Trochoidea rugosula R.A. Philippi, 1844: synonym of Trochoidea trochoides (Poiret, 1789)
 Trochoidea saintsimoni E. Caziot, 1903: synonym of Trochoidea trochoides (Poiret, 1789)
 Trochoidea seetzenii : synonym of Xerocrassa seetzeni
 Trochoidea scitula G.J. De Cristofori & G. Jan, 1832: synonym of Trochoidea elegans (J.F. Gmelin, 1791)
 Trochoidea simulata(C.G. Ehrenberg, 1831): synonym of Xerocrassa simulata (C.G. Ehrenberg, 1831) 
 Trochoidea solarium A. Risso, 1826: synonym of Trochoidea elegans (J.F. Gmelin, 1791)
 Trochoidea terrestris E. Donovan, 1801: synonym of Trochoidea elegans (J.F. Gmelin, 1791)
 Trochoidea trochillus J.L.M. Poiret, 1789: synonym of Trochoidea elegans (J.F. Gmelin, 1791)
 Trochoidea trochlea L. Pfeiffer, 1846: synonym of Trochoidea elegans (J.F. Gmelin, 1791)
 Trochoidea zaharensis : synonym of Xerocrassa zaharensis  (Puente & Arrébola, 1996)

References

  Bouchet P., Rocroi J.P., Hausdorf B., Kaim A., Kano Y., Nützel A., Parkhaev P., Schrödl M. & Strong E.E. (2017). Revised classification, nomenclator and typification of gastropod and monoplacophoran families. Malacologia. 61(1-2): 1-526.

External links
 Evidence for survival of Pleistocene climatic changes in Northern refugia by the land snail Trochoidea geyeri (Soós 1926) (Helicellinae, Stylommatophora)
 Monterosato, T. A. di. (1892). Molluschi terrestri delle isole adiacenti alla Sicilia. Atti della Reale Accademia di Scienze, Lettere e Belle Arti di Palermo. 3rd Series, 2: 1-34
 Beck, H. (1837-1838). Index molluscorum praesentis aevi musei principis augustissimi Christiani Frederici. 124 pp. Hafniae

 
Taxonomy articles created by Polbot